Pollex bulli is a moth of the family Erebidae first described by Michael Fibiger in 2007. It is known from Palawan in the Philippines.

The wingspan is about 9 mm. The forewing is narrow and light brown, except the subterminal area which is dark brown. The hindwing is unicolorous dark brown with an indistinct black discal spot and the underside unicolorous dark brown.

References

Micronoctuini
Moths described in 2007